Natalia Stanislavovna Vieru (born 25 July 1989) is a Russian basketball player. She is a member of the Russia women's national basketball team and competed in the 2012 Summer Olympics. Vieru played last for the Russian club UMMC Ekaterinburg as a center from 2015-2020.

With six 1st places in the EuroLeague Women Championship, Vieru is second to Diana Taurasi as the player holding the most Euroleague Women titles (2019, 2018, 2016 - UMMC; 2010, 2009, 2008 - Sparta&K M.R. Vidnoje).

National team
At a height of  Vieru was the tallest player in the Russian national team in 2018 and 2019. She placed fourth at the 2012 Olympics playing with the Russian team.

Main Achievements
1st place – EuroLeague Women (2008, 2009, 2010, 2016, 2018, 2019) 
1st place – Women SuperCup (2009, 2010, 2016, 2018)
1st place – Championship of Russia (2008, 2016, 2017, 2018, 2019)
2nd place – Championship of Russia (2009, 2010, 2011, 2013, 2015)
1st place – Russian Cup (2015, 2016, 2018)
4th place - Olympic games London (2012)
1st place – UMMC Cup (2015, 2016)
1st place – Championship of Slovakia (2012)
1st place – Cup of Slovakia (2012)
1st place – U20 European Championship Women (2008)
3rd place – U18 European Championship Women (2007)
MVP Championship of Slovakia (2012)
3x Best Russian Young Basketball Player (2007, 2008, 2009)
MVP U20 European Championship Women (2008)

References

Living people
Russian women's basketball players
1989 births
Basketball players at the 2012 Summer Olympics
Olympic basketball players of Russia
Moldovan emigrants to Russia
Centers (basketball)
Sportspeople from Chișinău
Universiade medalists in basketball
Universiade silver medalists for Russia
Medalists at the 2013 Summer Universiade